Mlangarini is an administrative ward in the Arumeru district of the Arusha Region of Tanzania. According to the 2012 census, the ward has a total population of 12,983.

References

Wards of Arusha District
Wards of Arusha Region